Fefan is the third largest inhabited island of the Chuuk Lagoon in the Federated States of Micronesia. It has an area of 13.2 km2 and a population of about 3,000 (last census: 1980). The northern part of the island is hilly and peaks at 298 meters above sea level.

Education
Chuuk State Department of Education operates public schools.

Southern Namoneas High School is on Fefen Island.

References

External links
 Directory of the islands of Micronesia

Islands of Chuuk State
Municipalities of Chuuk State